Mount Crysdale, is a  ultra-prominent, isolated peak in the Misinchinka Ranges, a subdivision range of the Hart Ranges, within the Northern Rocky Mountains. 

Officially adopted on 2 September 1954, Mount Crysdale is named after C.R. Crysdale, Chief Engineer, Pacific Great Eastern Railway.

References 

Two-thousanders of British Columbia
Northern Interior of British Columbia
Canadian Rockies
Peace River Land District